The Expedition of Qutbah ibn Amir, against the Khath'am tribe, took place in August 630 AD, 9AH, 2nd month, of the Islamic Calendar.

Expedition
In 9AH, August 630 AD, Muhammad sent Qutbah ibn Amir to carry out a raid against the Khath'am tribe. Qutbah ibn Amir was accompanied by 20 men with 10 camels. Qutbah raided the inhabitants while they were asleep and killed many of them. A large number of people from both sides were killed.

They also captured a large number of camels and goats, as well as some women. All the war booty was brought back to Madinah.

According to Muslim sources, the inhabitants then regrouped and chased the Muslims, but because of flooding in the area, the Muslims managed to escape.

Islamic sources

Primary sources

The event is also mentioned by Muslim Scholar Ibn Sa'd in his book "Kitab al-tabaqat al-kabir", as follows:

Secondary sources
The Muslim scholar Ibn Qayyim Al-Jawziyya wrote about the event in his biography of Muhammad as follows:

Hadith literature
This Expedition took place in the Khath’am region.  mentions that Muhammad sent an expedition to Khath'am

See also
Military career of Muhammad
List of expeditions of Muhammad

References

630
Campaigns ordered by Muhammad